Joseph James Siddle (August 25, 1921 – September 25, 2006), nicknamed "Jumping Joe", was an American Negro league first baseman in the 1940s.

A native of Guilford County, North Carolina, Siddle played on several local semi-pro teams, and served in the US Army during World War II. In 1946, he played for the Kansas City Monarchs, and went on to play minor league baseball with the Winston-Salem Twins. Siddle died in Greensboro, North Carolina in 2006 at age 85.

References

1921 births
2006 deaths
Kansas City Monarchs players